Bahadurganj may refer to:

 Bahadurganj, Kishanganj, a town in Kishanganj district, Bihar, India
 Bahadurganj, Ghazipur, a town in Ghazipur district, Uttar Pradesh, India
 Bahadurganj, Lumbini, Nepal
 Bahadurganj (Vidhan Sabha constituency) in Kishanganj district, Bihar